La Roche-Jaudy is a commune in the Côtes-d'Armor department of Brittany in northwestern France. It was established on 1 January 2019 by merger of the former communes of La Roche-Derrien (the seat), Hengoat, Pommerit-Jaudy and Pouldouran.

Geography

Climate
La Roche-Jaudy has a oceanic climate (Köppen climate classification Cfb).

Population

See also
Communes of the Côtes-d'Armor department

References

Communes of Côtes-d'Armor
Communes nouvelles of Côtes-d'Armor

Populated places established in 2019
2019 establishments in France